Drežniške Ravne is a settlement in the Municipality of Kobarid in the Littoral region of Slovenia.

The local church is dedicated to Saint Matthew and dates to 1511. The church itself with some of its furnishings was damaged in an earthquake in 1998, but this also revealed traces of late Gothic frescos on the walls.

References

External links
Drežniške Ravne on Geopedia

Populated places in the Municipality of Kobarid